Christopher James Walker-Hebborn (born 1 July 1990) is an English swimmer who competed for Great Britain at the 2012 Summer Olympics and the 2016 Summer Olympics, winning a silver medal at the latter.

A successful youth and junior athlete, Walker-Hebborn achieved a breakout year in 2014, winning two Commonwealth Games titles and three European Championship titles, including the Commonwealth Games and European Championships 100-metre backstroke gold medals.

A key member of the England and Great Britain medley relay teams, he formed part of the world record breaking, world title winning Great Britain mixed medley team at the 2015 World Aquatics Championships. He also won gold medals as part of the England men's medley relay at the 2014 Commonwealth Games, and both men's and mixed medlay relay teams at the 2014 European Aquatics Championships, again with Great Britain. In 2016 he was part of the Great Britain team to retain both the men's and mixed medley relay titles, his fourth and fifth European golds. At the 2016 Rio Olympics he won a silver medal as part of the men's 4 × 100 m medley relay.

Early career
He is currently based at the University of Bath, where he trains at one of British Swimming's Intensive Training Centres. As a teenager he spent two years at the British Offshore Centre in Australia at The Southport School, from 2006 to 2008.

In March 2009, he qualified for his first senior World Championships after beating event favourite James Goddard in the 200 m backstroke at the British Championships, held in Sheffield.

Walker-Hebborn's preliminary heat performance in Rome secured him a place in the semifinals where, as one of the few swimmers not wearing the controversial full body suit. This is when he set a new British record to become a finalist. The record was to stand only briefly, as he broke it again in the finals (1:56.05), placing 9th.

He was offered a scholarship at Florida State University in January 2009 but returned to his Bury St. Edmunds home after just a few weeks due to lack of long course training.

Later career 
At the 2012 Summer Olympics, he competed in the men's 100 and 200 m backstroke, finishing in 20th and 22nd respectively.

In 2014, he won gold at the Commonwealth Games in the 100 m backstroke, in a new Games record of 53.12 seconds.  He was also part of the English  medley relay team that won gold in a Games record, and the  freestyle team that won bronze.

At the 2016, he teamed with Adam Peaty, James Guy and Duncan Scott in the GB team that won a silver medal in the men's  medley relay at the 2016 Summer Olympics.  He also finished in 11th in the men's 100 m backstroke.

Competition results

References

External links
Official Chris Walker-Hebborn website
British Swimming athlete profile

1990 births
Living people
English male swimmers
Olympic swimmers of Great Britain
Swimmers at the 2012 Summer Olympics
Male backstroke swimmers
Swimmers at the 2014 Commonwealth Games
Commonwealth Games gold medallists for England
Sportspeople from London
People from Enfield, London
World Aquatics Championships medalists in swimming
European Aquatics Championships medalists in swimming
Medalists at the FINA World Swimming Championships (25 m)
World record setters in swimming
Commonwealth Games bronze medallists for England
Swimmers at the 2016 Summer Olympics
Olympic silver medallists for Great Britain
Medalists at the 2016 Summer Olympics
Olympic silver medalists in swimming
Commonwealth Games medallists in swimming
Team Bath swimmers
Medallists at the 2014 Commonwealth Games